Sextus Julius may refer to:

Any Sextus Julius Caesar (disambiguation)
 Sextus Julius Frontinus, better known as Frontinus, author of treatises on aqueducts and military tactics
 Sextus Julius Major, proconsul of Africa AD 141–142
 Sextus Julius Severus, a Roman governor in the 2nd century AD
 Sextus Julius Saturninus, praenomen possibly Gaius, one of the usurpers of Gallienus
 Sextus Julius Africanus, a Christian traveller and historian of the late 2nd and early 3rd century AD